Once a Thief is a 1965 crime film directed by Ralph Nelson and starring Alain Delon, Ann-Margret, Van Heflin and Jack Palance. It was written by Zekial Marko, based on his 1961 novel Scratch a Thief. The movie was known in France as Les tueurs de San Francisco.

Nelson won the OCIC award at the 1965 San Sebastián International Film Festival for the film.

Plot
Ex-convict Eddie Pedak (Delon) tries to lead a normal life in San Francisco with a loving wife Kristine (Ann-Margret), a daughter, and a steady job. Much to his chagrin, he also has a vengeful police detective (Heflin) and estranged brother (Palance) complicating his life.

The detective, Mike Vido, remains bitter over being shot six years ago during an unsolved robbery. Despite only having seen the shooter's eyes, he is sure that it was Eddie. Since Eddie's release from prison, Vido has harassed him and gotten him fired from numerous jobs. When a shopkeeper is killed in a robbery, he is convinced it is again Eddie, but the witness insists otherwise. Eddie nonetheless loses his job because of the arrest.

Meanwhile, Eddie's brother Walter, head of a criminal gang, attempts to recruit him for a final heist, offering him $50,000 for one night's work. Eddie refuses, but he is unable to secure another job or collect unemployment, prompting Kristine to begin working as a waitress. Walter drops by and informs him that Kristine's job is really at a sleazy nightclub, where Eddie finds her, to his fury. Eddie then agrees to participate in the heist, and it is revealed why Walter has been so persistent about Eddie's participation: they plan to rob his former employer, and his inside knowledge of the company is vital to the robbery. It becomes evident that Sargatanas and Shoenstein, other members of Walter's gang, framed Eddie for the shopkeeper's murder, and mistrust grows. After doing his own investigating, Vido approaches Eddie and tells him he knows that he was framed for the murder. He gives Eddie the chance to come clean before the heist, but Eddie turns him down.

The thieves get away with $1 million in platinum. After Sargatanas kills another member of the gang, Eddie and Walter take off with the loot and hide in a truck. Sargatanas and Shoenstein find and kill Walter, and abduct Eddie's daughter in order to trade her for the platinum.

Eddie finds Vido, and tells him about the kidnapping. Vido agrees to help him in exchange for his confession and the return of the stolen platinum. After Eddie finally admits that he did in fact shoot Vido years ago, Vido is surprised to find that he no longer feels vindictive. Eddie and Vido make their way to the arranged meetup, where the remaining thieves and the loot are, as well as his daughter. After his daughter is released, Eddie brings them to the truck containing the platinum. Sargatanas suddenly kills Shoenstein,  initiating a shootout that results in the wounding of Eddie and Vido. After a struggle with Eddie over the gun, Sargatanas dies. With the gun in his grasp, Eddie staggers triumphantly toward Vido. Vido’s partner arrives on the scene. He quickly and incorrectly assesses the situation and kills Eddie, to Vido's dismay.

Cast
 Alain Delon as Eddie Pedak
 Ann-Margret as Kristine Pedak
 Van Heflin as Mike Vido
 Jack Palance as Walter Pedak
 John Davis Chandler as Sargatanas
 Tony Musante as Shoenstein
 Jeff Corey as Lt. Kebner
 Steve Mitchell as Frank Kane

Production
The story was based on the personal experiences of screenwriter Zekial Marko; he had written the novel The Big Grab, which was adapted into Any Number Can Win, a big hit for Delon. Once a Thief was based on Marko's novel Scratch a Thief and this was his first screenplay. Marko had a small role in the film and spent time in jail on criminal charges during the shoot.

Critical reception
A. H. Weiler of The New York Times wrote that the film was not as good as similar genre pictures, but praised the accuracy of its gangster dialogue:

Filmink argued "ikt was not a bad movie and at least had aspirations to quality, but it just... couldn’t quite live up to its ambition."

The film was not a success at the box office.

See also
 List of American films of 1965
 List of hood films

References

External links
 
 
 
 

1965 films
1965 crime drama films
1960s crime thriller films
1960s heist films
American crime drama films
French crime drama films
American crime thriller films
French crime thriller films
American heist films
French heist films
1960s English-language films
Films about brothers
Films based on American novels
Films based on crime novels
Films directed by Ralph Nelson
Films scored by Lalo Schifrin
Films set in San Francisco
Films shot in San Francisco
1960s Italian-language films
Metro-Goldwyn-Mayer films
French neo-noir films
English-language French films
American neo-noir films
1960s multilingual films
American multilingual films
French multilingual films
1960s American films
1960s French films